Queens County Savings Bank is a historic bank building, that used to house the Kew Gardens Hills branch of the Queens Library, located in the Kew Gardens Hills section of the New York City borough of Queens.  It was built in 1953-1954 to resemble Independence Hall in the Georgian Revival style.  It is a brick building that consists of a tall central tower with flanking two story, side gabled wings.  It is four bays wide and has a six-stage, square tower featuring a second story Palladian window. The tower has an octagonal belfry topped by a smaller cupola and spire.

It was listed on the National Register of Historic Places in 2005.

References

Bank buildings on the National Register of Historic Places in New York City
Georgian Revival architecture in New York City
Commercial buildings completed in 1954
Commercial buildings in Queens, New York
Kew Gardens Hills, Queens
National Register of Historic Places in Queens, New York
1954 establishments in New York City